Gisors (formerly: Gisors-Embranchement) is a railway station serving the town Gisors, Eure department, northwestern France. It is situated on the now partially disbanded Saint-Denis–Dieppe railway.

The station is serviced by both TER Normandie and Trasilien line J trains.

External links
 
Timetables Transilien 

Railway stations in Eure
Railway stations in France opened in 1868